Brendan Leipsic (born May 19, 1994) is a Canadian professional ice hockey forward currently playing for Metallurg Magnitogorsk of the Kontinental Hockey League (KHL). Leipsic was selected by the Nashville Predators in the third round (89th overall) of the 2012 NHL Entry Draft.

After stints with the Toronto Maple Leafs, Vegas Golden Knights, Vancouver Canucks and Los Angeles Kings, he was signed by the Washington Capitals to a one-year, $700,000 contract on July 1, 2019. During the indefinite suspension of league play due to the COVID-19 pandemic, Leipsic was the subject of controversy after a conversation on Leipsic's private Instagram account was leaked to the public. In response to his conduct, on May 8, 2020, the Capitals placed Leipsic on unconditional waivers for purposes of terminating his contract. Leipsic cleared waivers the following day and his contract was terminated.

Personal
Leipsic was born in Winnipeg, Manitoba, Canada, and is Jewish.  His mother Kathleen was a gymnast who was an alternate for Canada at the 1984 Los Angeles Olympics, and his father Greg was a high school running back. His brother Jeremey led the Manitoba Junior Hockey League in scoring in 2016/17 following which he played for the University of Manitoba Bisons hockey team; as well as a sister (Emma) who was an international gymnast.

Playing career

Junior 
Leipsic played in the WHL from the 2010–11 season. He was a member of Canada's National Junior Team for the 2012 Canada-Russia Challenge.

In the 2012–13 season with the Portland Winterhawks, Leipsic scored 120 points in 68 games to win the CHL Top Scorer Award as the highest-scoring player in the Canadian Hockey League.

National Hockey League

Nashville Predators 

Leipsic was selected by the Nashville Predators in the third-round (89th overall) of the 2012 NHL Entry Draft. On May 23, 2013, the Predators signed Leipsic to a three-year entry-level contract.

Leipsic was assigned to the Predators AHL affiliate, the Milwaukee Admirals to begin his first professional season in 2014–15. He led the Admirals in rookie scoring with 36 points in 47 games.

Toronto Maple Leafs 
On February 15, 2015, the Predators traded Leipsic along with Olli Jokinen and Nashville's 2015 first round draft pick to the Toronto Maple Leafs in a package deal for Cody Franson and Mike Santorelli. Leipsic played an important role down the stretch in helping the Toronto Marlies (a team that struggled to score early in the year) reach the post-season.

Leipsic began the 2015–16 season with the Marlies, and would play there for most of the year. However, in February 2016, the Maple Leafs lineup was depleted due to injuries. Wanting to allow younger players to remain in the AHL and develop, Toronto initially called up older veterans.

When injury struck again however, Leipsic was called up on February 13, 2016, in reward for his strong play, along with Jeremy Morin, both on an emergency basis. Leipsic made his debut the same night, in a road game against the Vancouver Canucks, and scored his first NHL goal midway through the second period, batting a flying puck out of mid-air and past goaltender Ryan Miller. The reaction of Leipsic's parents, who were in attendance and flew last minute to the game, garnered much media attention. Leipsic became the first Maple Leafs' player to score a goal in his NHL debut since Nikolay Kulemin in 2008. Leipsic was sent back to the Marlies shortly after his debut.

Vegas Golden Knights 
On June 21, 2017, Leipsic was left exposed at the 2017 NHL Expansion Draft by the Toronto Maple Leafs, and was selected by the Vegas Golden Knights. He signed a two-year $1.3 million contract in July 2017.

Vancouver Canucks 
On February 26, 2018, Leipsic was traded to the Vancouver Canucks in exchange for Philip Holm.

Los Angeles Kings 
In the 2018–19 season, on December 3, 2018, Leipsic was placed on waivers by the Canucks and claimed by the Los Angeles Kings.

Washington Capitals 

Leipsic was not tendered a qualifying offer by the Kings and was released as a free agent on June 25, 2019. He was signed by the Washington Capitals to a one-year, $700,000 contract on July 1, 2019. In the 2019–20 season, Leipsic remained on the Capitals roster for opening night. In a depth forward role, Leipsic registered 3 goals and 8 assists for 11 points in 61 games, before the season was suspended due to the COVID-19 pandemic.

Kontinental Hockey League

HC CSKA Moscow 
Leipsic’s contract with the Capitals was terminated in May 2020 due to a sexually charged and disrespectful private group chat was leaked in which he insulted women. Leipsic opted to resume his career by agreeing to a one-year contract with the Russian club, HC CSKA Moscow of the KHL, on August 4, 2020. In the 2020–21 season,  he posted 11 goals and 24 points in 42 regular season games along with 8 points in 16 playoff games.

Metallurg Magnitogorsk 
On May 7, 2021, Leipsic was traded by CSKA to Metallurg Magnitogorsk in exchange for the rights to Lias Andersson, and immediately signed a two-year contract with the club. He participated in the 2021–22 playoffs, despite the exit of many North American-born players and two of the KHL's non-Russia-based teams due to the 2022 Russian invasion of Ukraine.

Career statistics

Regular season and playoffs

International

Awards and honors

See also
List of select Jewish ice hockey players

References

External links 
 

1994 births
Living people
Canadian ice hockey left wingers
HC CSKA Moscow players
Jewish Canadian sportspeople
Jewish ice hockey players
Los Angeles Kings players
Metallurg Magnitogorsk players
Milwaukee Admirals players
Nashville Predators draft picks
Portland Winterhawks players
Ice hockey people from Winnipeg
Toronto Maple Leafs players
Toronto Marlies players
Vancouver Canucks players
Vegas Golden Knights players
Washington Capitals players